San Luis is a district of the Lima Province in Peru. In San Luis the National Sports Village is located in charge of the Peruvian Sports Institute, which has facilities for the practice of various sports (athletics, cycling, volleyball, swimming, softball and baseball). In addition, within its facilities is the headquarters of the Peruvian Olympic Committee and the Peruvian Football Federation (training place of the Peruvian Football Team, both senior and junior categories.

History 
It is part of city of Lima. Officially established as a district on May 30, 1968, by President Fernando Belaúnde.

The current mayor (alcalde) of San Luis is David Rojas Maza. The district's postal code is 30.

Geography
The district has a total land area of 3.49 km2. Its administrative center is located 175 meters above sea level.

Boundaries
 North: El Agustino
 East: Ate
 South: San Borja
 West: La Victoria

Demographics
According to the 2005 census by the INEI, the district has 46,258 inhabitants, a population density of 13,254.4 persons/km2 and 11,901 households.

See also 
 Administrative divisions of Peru

References

External links
  Official district's web site

Districts of Lima